White Gold may refer to:

 White gold, an alloy of gold and at least one white metal

Music
 White Gold (album), a 1974 rhythm and blues album by the Love Unlimited Orchestra
 White Gold: The Very Best of Barry White, a 2005 compilation album by soul artist Barry White
 "White Gold" (Ladytron song), a song by the band Ladytron from the album Gravity the Seducer
 "White Gold" (Ten Sharp song), a b-side track by the band Ten Sharp

Film and television
 White Gold (1927 film), directed by William K. Howard and starring Jetta Goudal
 White Gold (1949 film), an Austrian film directed by Eduard von Borsody
 White Gold (2003 film), a Russian action film
 White Gold (2010 film), a South African historical drama film
 "White Gold" (M*A*S*H), a 1975 episode of the television series M*A*S*H
 White Gold (TV series), a BBC comedy series set in Essex in the 1980s

Other
 White Gold: War in Paradise, a 2008 video game
 White Gold: The Extraordinary Story of Thomas Pellow and North Africa's One Million European Slaves, a 2005 book by Giles Milton
 White gold, an obsolete term for platinum

See also
 Gold (disambiguation)